James Hopkins (born 1873) was an English footballer. His regular position was as an inside right. He was born in Manchester. He played a single game for Newton Heath, the club that would later become Manchester United, against New Brighton Tower on 18 March 1899, having previously played for Berry's Association.

References

External links
MUFCInfo.com profile

1873 births
Footballers from Manchester
English footballers
Association football inside forwards
Manchester United F.C. players
English Football League players
Year of death missing